Cebeci is a Turkish word. It may refer to:

 Cebeci (corps), a part of Ottoman artillery corps
 Cebeci Asri Cemetery, a cemetery located in the Cebeci quarter of Ankara, Turkey
 Cebeci İnönü Stadium, a multi-purpose stadium in Ankara, Turkey .
 Cebeci–Smith model, a viscosity model used in computational fluid dynamics analysis